Corner Brook is a provincial electoral district in Newfoundland and Labrador. As of 2011, there are 13,718 people living in the district.

Corner Brook merges most of the former district of Humber East and most of the former district of Humber West. The district was created following the 2015 electoral districts boundaries review.

The district consists of parts of the city of Corner Brook.

Members of the House of Assembly
The district has elected the following Members of the House of Assembly:

Election results

References

Newfoundland and Labrador provincial electoral districts
Corner Brook
2015 establishments in Newfoundland and Labrador